Jamie Moul (born 26 September 1984) is an English professional golfer who became the third man to top the World Amateur Golf Ranking on 13 February 2007.

Moul plays out of Stoke-by-Nayland Golf Club near Colchester in Essex. His tournament wins include the 2006 Lytham Trophy, and the 2007 Brabazon Trophy (jointly with Romain Bechu).

Moul played on the Great Britain and Ireland team in the 2007 Walker Cup. He played in all four rounds. On the Saturday, he halved the foursomes with his partner Daniel Willett, and won his singles by 1 hole against opponent, Chris Kirk. On Sunday, Moul lost twice, again playing with Daniel Willett in the morning foursomes, and losing to Jamie Lovemark in the afternoon singles. Great Britain & Ireland lost to the United States 12½ to 11½.

Moul turned professional after the 2007 Walker Cup.

In 2011, Moul won his first Challenge Tour event at the inaugural Acaya Open in Italy.

Moul is coached by Ipswich-based professional Kevin Lovelock.

Amateur wins
2006 Lytham Trophy
2007 Brabazon Trophy (tie with Romain Bechu)

Professional wins (2)

Challenge Tour wins (1)

Jamega Pro Golf Tour wins (1)

Team appearances
Amateur
European Boys' Team Championship (representing England): 2002
Jacques Léglise Trophy (representing Great Britain and Ireland): 2002 (winners)
European Youths' Team Championship (representing England): 2004
European Amateur Team Championship (representing England): 2005 (winners), 2007
Eisenhower Trophy (representing England): 2006
St Andrews Trophy (representing Great Britain & Ireland): 2006 (winners)
Walker Cup (representing Great Britain & Ireland): 2007

See also
2011 Challenge Tour graduates

References

External links

English male golfers
European Tour golfers
Sportspeople from Chelmsford
Sportspeople from Colchester
1984 births
Living people